Anathallis articulata is a species of orchid plant.

References 

articulata
Plants described in 1842